{{Infobox government agency
|agency_name     = Danish Ministry of Defence (MoD)
|nativename      = Forsvarsministeriet
|type            = Ministry
|logo            = File:DK Ministry of Defence.jpg
|logo_width      = 300 px
|logo_caption    =
|seal            = 
|seal_width      = 
|formed          = 
|preceding1      = Ministry of War
|preceding2      = Marine Ministry
|dissolved       =
|superseding     =
|headquarters    = Holmens Kanal 42, Copenhagen
|coordinates     =
|region_code     = 1060
|employees       =  
|budget          = 21 billion DKK (2016)
|chief1_name     = Jakob Ellemann-Jensen Venstre)
|chief1_position = Defence Minister
|chief2_name     = Thomas Ahrenkiel
|chief2_position = Permanent secretary
|agency_type     = 
|child1_agency   = 
|website         = 
|footnotes       =
}}

The Danish Ministry of Defence (short FMN) is a ministry in the Danish government. It is charged with overall planning, development, and strategic guidance of the entire area of responsibility of the Danish Defence minister, including the armed forces and the emergency management sector. It is Denmark's ministry of defence. It is the secretariat of the Danish Defence Minister.

It is also the administrator of the easternmost land in Denmark, the small archipelago, Ertholmene, whose administrator is employed by the ministry.

History
The Ministry of Defence was established following the Danish defence law of May 27, 1950 (law #272), about the central structure of the military of Denmark. This combined the two previous ministries; Ministry of War (Krigsministeriet) and the Marine ministry (Marineministeriet). The Minister of Defence had already been created in 1905 as the head of both ministries, though still with branch (Army and Navy) chiefs as administrators.

This new Ministry can though trace its history back to 1660, when King Frederick III established a War collegium (Krigskollegium) for the Army to in both war- and peacetime to administer the Army. A similar command had previously been created for the Navy, the Admiralty (Admiralitetet) of 1655.

The War collegium changed name to Krigskancelliet in 1679 and later to Generalitets- og Kommisariatskollegiet''. The day after the de facto end to absolute monarchy in Denmark, March 21, 1848, Anton Frederik Tscherning became the first War minister of Denmark, with the Generalitets- og Kommisariatskollegiet changing name into the Ministry of War on March 25, 1848.
Likewise Adam Wilhelm Moltke became the first Marine minister (simultaneous Prime minister), while the Admiralty changed into the Marine ministry on April 21, 1848.

Organisation of the combine
 Defence Command (VFK) 
 Royal Danish Defence College (FAK)
 Danish Armed Forces Health Services (FSU)
 Danish Defence Acquisition and Logistics Organization (FMI)
 Danish Defence Personnel Organisation (FPS)
 Danish Defence Estates and Infrastructure Organisation (FES)
 Home Guard Command (HJK)
 Defence Intelligence Service (FE) 
 Judge Advocate Corps (FAUK)
 Defence Financial Management Agency (FRS)
 Emergency Management Agency  (BRS)
 Administration of Conscientious Objector (MNA)

See also 
 List of Danish government ministries

References

Ministry of Defence
Defence
Denmark
Denmark, Defence
1950 establishments in Denmark
Denmark